Ricki Chaplin (born 24 August 1964) is a British weightlifter. He competed in the men's middleweight event at the 1988 Summer Olympics.

References

External links
 

1964 births
Living people
British male weightlifters
Olympic weightlifters of Great Britain
Weightlifters at the 1988 Summer Olympics
Sportspeople from Bristol
20th-century British people